Mooreville, sometimes misspelled as Mooresville, is an unincorporated community and census-designated place (CDP) in Lee County, Mississippi, United States. As of the 2010 census the population was 650.

Mooreville is part of the Tupelo Micropolitan Statistical Area. It has a post office and a ZIP code (38857).

History
The community was named for the Moore family, its first settlers.

In 1900, Mooreville had an academy, three churches, a masonic lodge, and a Woodmen of the World lodge. It also had a population of 54.

Geography
The Interstate 22 / U.S. Route 78 freeway forms the northern edge of the community, with access from Exit 94 (Highway 371). I-22/US-78 lead northwest  to Memphis, Tennessee, and southeast  to Birmingham, Alabama. Highway 371 leads northeast  to Mantachie and south  to Bigbee.

Boguegaba Creek flows through the west side of the community, and Boguefala Creek flows through the eastern side. The creeks flow south-southeast to the Tombigbee River north of Amory. South Tulip Creek forms the western edge of the CDP; the creek flows southwest to Tulip Creek and thence Town Creek, which flows south-southeast to the Tombigbee south of Amory. The Lee-Itawamba county line forms the eastern edge of the CDP.

Demographics

Education
It is in the Lee County School District.

Notable people
 Thomas K. Boggan, member of the Mississippi State Senate from 1916 to 1920
 Olin Francis, actor
 Jamie Franks, member of the Mississippi House of Representatives from 2000 to 2007
 Ray Harris, rockabilly musician and songwriter
 Peggy Webb, author

References

Unincorporated communities in Lee County, Mississippi
Unincorporated communities in Mississippi